Lick Run is a  urban stream in southern Allegheny County, Pennsylvania, a tributary of Peters Creek.  The former Lick Run coal mine of the Pittsburgh Coal Company had its mouth near the stream, along the B&O Railroad line.

Several stone arch bridges cross the stream.  One carries Brownsville Road over the stream near Broughton.  A National Landmark stone arch bridge carries Cochran Mill Road over the stream further downstream.

See also
List of rivers of Pennsylvania

References

Rivers of Allegheny County, Pennsylvania
Pittsburgh metropolitan area
Rivers of Pennsylvania
Tributaries of the Monongahela River